Italy is scheduled to compete at the 2024 Summer Olympics in Paris from 26 July to 11 August 2024. Italian athletes have appeared in every Summer Olympics edition of the modern era, with the disputed exception of St. Louis 1904 in which one Italian may have competed.

Competitors
The following is the list of number of competitors in the Games. Note that reserves in field hockey, football, and handball are not counted:

Athletics

Italian track and field athletes achieved the entry standards for Paris 2024, either by passing the direct qualifying mark (or time for track and road races) or by world ranking, in the following events (a maximum of 3 athletes each):

Gymnastics 

Italy entered one rhythmic gymnast into the individual all-around tournament by winning a gold medal and securing one of the three available berths at the 2022 World Championships in Sofia, Bulgaria.

Shooting

Italian shooters achieved quota places for the following events based on their results at the 2022 and 2023 ISSF World Championships, 2022, 2023, and 2024 European Championships, 2023 European Games, and 2024 ISSF World Olympic Qualification Tournament, if they obtained a minimum qualifying score (MQS) from 14 August 2022 to 9 June 2024.

References

Nations at the 2024 Summer Olympics
2024
2024 in Italian sport